Bobby Sanabria (born June 2, 1957) is an American drummer, percussionist, composer, arranger, producer, educator, activist, radio show host of Puerto Rican descent who specializes in jazz and Latin jazz.

Biography
Sanabria was born in the South Bronx in New York City on June 2, 1957 of Puerto Rican descent. He graduated from the Berklee College of Music in 1979 with his Bachelor of Music degree in both jazz drum set and classical percussion, minoring in arranging and composition  receiving the Faculty Association Award for his excellence as a player and student. He has appeared over the years all over the world teaching about and performing Latin jazz. He has written articles for Modern Drummer, DRUM, Downbeat, Traps, and is a regular contributor to the WBGO website and written liner notes for over 50 CD releases. He has been featured in Downbeat, The New York Times, New York Daily News, Modern Drummer, Drum, Percussion, NPR, and NPR Latino USA.

His albums Afro-Cuban Dream: Live and in Clave, Big Band Urban Folktales, Multiverse, and West Side Story Reimagined were all nominated for a Grammy Award for Best Latin Jazz Album. West Side Story Reimagined also won the Jazz Journalists Award for Best Jazz Album of 2019. They have been critically praised for their forward thinking vision in expanding the  boundaries of the Latin jazz big band tradition. 

"...(Mr. Sanabria) expands the possibilities, moving the sounds of bands like that of (Puente, Machito), with all the heft and intricacy and clave-based dance rhythm, into the harmonically oriented sophistication of current New York jazz players. It's New York up and down, and back and forth across the last century, from the streets to the mambo palaces to the conservatories." 
- Ben Ratliff, The New York Times

The Wall Street Journal reviewer Will Friedwald wrote, “There’s every reason to hope that Steven Spielberg’s remake of West Side Story will improve upon the 1961 film, but I doubt if we’ll ever hear a more thrilling interpretation of that immortal score than that of the Bobby Sanabria Multiverse Big Band.”

Known as a drummer, percussionist, composer, arranger, conductor, documentary film producer, educator, activist, and bandleader, his versatility as both a drummer and percussionist, from small group to big band, has become legendary. A native son of the South Bronx born to Puerto Rican parents, he has performed and recorded with every major figure in the world of Latin jazz and salsa, from the founder of the Afro-Cuban/Latin jazz movement Mario Bauzá, to Tito Puente, Mongo Santamaría, Dizzy Gillespie, Chico O’Farrill, Ray Barretto, Candido, to Larry Harlow, Ruben Blades, Celia Cruz, and jazz luminaries as diverse as Henry Threadgill, Charles McPherson, Randy Brecker, Joe Chambers, Jean Lucien, The Mills Brothers, and others. DRUM! Magazine named him Percussionist of the Year (2005); he was named Percussionist of the Year by the Jazz Journalists Association in 2011 and 2013. In 2006, he was inducted into the Bronx Walk of Fame. He was a recipient of the 2018 Jazz Education Network (JEN) LeJENS of Jazz Lifetime Achievement Award for his work as a musician and educator. In 2008 Congressman Dennis Kucinich honored his work as a musician and educator by reading his name into the Congressional Record and in 2018 the U.S. Congressional Black Caucus honored him as a musician, educator. Every single one of his big band recordings, seven in total, have been nominated for Grammys. His 2018 recording, West Side Story Reimagined, reached #1 on the national Jazz Week radio charts, was nominated for a 2018 Grammy, and won the prestigious 2019 Record of The Year Award from the Jazz Journalists Association. Partial proceeds from sales of this double CD set go to the Jazz Foundation of America’s Puerto Rico Relief Fund for musicians. Mr. Sanabria has composed the music for several award winning, critically acclaimed documentaries - From Mambo to Hip Hip: A South Bronx Tale (2006) where he was also a producer, consultant and on air personality, Some Girls (2017), and La Madrina: The Savage Life of Loraine Padilla (2020). Other documentaries he has been featured in on screen and acted as a consultant, producer are, The Palladium: Where Mambo Was King (2003), Latin Music U.S.A. (2006), We Like It Like That: The Story of Latin Boogaloo (2015), and Let's Get The Rhythm 2016).  In 2019 he was named Godfather/Padrino of the National Puerto Rican Day Parade in New York City. He is the Co-Artistic Director of the Bronx Music Heritage Center and the Bronx Music Hall. His lifetime dedication to spreading the history, culture, of jazz and Latin jazz to the general public as a performer, as well as educating a new generation of players, composers, arrangers, has no parallel. A member of Max Roach’s legendary M’BOOM percussion ensemble, he is on the faculty of the New School (his 28th year) and NYU and was on the faculty of the Manhattan School of Music for 20 years. He is also the on air host of the Latin Jazz Cruise on WBGO FM and wbgo.org, the number one jazz station in the nation where he also is a frequently featured writer on the website.

Maestro Sanabria has been recently honored by Lehman College by being bestowed an Honorary Doctorate in Music.

He endorses TAMA drums, Sabian cymbals, Latin Percussion Inc. instruments, Remo drum heads, and Vic Firth sticks and mallets

Discography

As leader
1993 - ¡New York City Ache!
2000 - Afro-Cuban Dream: Live and in Clave!!! (Arabesque) Grammy nominated
2002 - Bobby Sanabria & ¡Quarteto Aché! (Zoho Music)
2003 - 50 Years of Mambo: A Tribute to Damaso Perez Prado (Mambo Maniacs) Latin Grammy nominated
2007 - Big Band Urban Folktales Grammy nominated
2009 - Kenya Revisited Live!!! (Jazzheads) Latin Grammy nominated
2011 - Tito Puente Masterworks Live!!! (Jazzheads) Latin Grammy nominated
2012 - Multiverse (Jazzheads) double Grammy nominated
2018 - West Side Story Reimagined Grammy nominated, Jazz Journalists Association Album of The Year
May 2023 - VOX HUMANA (Jazzheads) Bobby Sanabria Multiverse Big Band featuring Janis Siegel, Antoinette Montague, Jennifer Jade Ledesna

As sideman
 Mongo Santamaria, Mongo Magic, 1983
 Mongo Santamaria, Espiritu Libre, 1984
 Luis Perico Ortiz - Breaking The Rules, 1987
 Yomo Toro - Gracias, 1990
 Mario Bauzá, Tanga Suite, 1991
 The Mambo Kings Soundtrack, 1991
 Mario Bauzá – My Time is Now, 1992
 Paquito D'Rivera and the United Nations Orchestra, A Night in Englewood, 1993
 Mario Bauzá, 944 Columbus, 1993
 Carola Grey, The Age Of Illusions, 1994
 Spider Saloff, Sextet, 1995
 Michael Philip Mossman, Spring Dance, 1995
 Jorge Sylvester, Musicollage, 1996
 Daniel Schnyder, Tarantula, 1996
 Sekou Sundiata, The Blue Oneness of Dreams, 1997
 Frank London, Debt, 1997
 Cuba: I  Am Time, 1997	
 Michael Philip Mossman, Mama Soho, 1998
 Ford Montreux Detroit Jazz Festival. 1998
 Charles McPherson, Manhattan Nocturne, 1998
 Men with Guns (Hombres Armados) Soundtrack, 1998
 Larry Harlow, Larry Harlow's Latin Legends Band, 1998
 John Fedchock, On the Edge, 1998
 William Cepeda, Afrorican Jazz… My Roots and Beyond, 1998
 Mario Bauzá, Messidor's Finest, 1998
 Jerome Van Rossum Diplomatic Immunity, 1998
 Viento De Agua, De Puerto Rico Al Mundo, 1998
 Chris Washburne & The SYOTOS Band, Nuyorican Nights, 1998
 Cuba, I Am Time, Vol. 4: Cubano Jazz, 1999	
 Jorge Sylvester, In the Ear of the Beholder, 2000
 Ray Barretto, Portraits In Jazz & Clave, 2000
 Sekou Sundiata, Long Story Short, 2000
 Eugenia León, Acercate Mas, 2000
 Ray Barretto & New World Spirit, Trancedance, 2001
 Chris Washburne & The SYOTOS Band, The Other Side 2001
 Donato Póveda, Bohemio Enamorado 2002
 Hilary Noble, Noble Savage, 2002
 Joe Chambers, Urban Grooves, 2002
 David Gonzalez, City of Dreams, 2002
 NewYorkestra Big Band Urban Soundscapes, 2002
 John Fedchock New York Big Band, No Nonsense, 2002
 Larry Harlow & His Latin Jazz Encounter, Live at Birdland, 2002
 Chris Washburne & The SYTOS Band, Paradise In Trouble 2003
 John Fedchock New York Big Band, No Nonsense 2003
 Joe Chambers, Urban Grooves, 2003
 Lou Caputo, Urban Still Life, 2003
 Ray Barretto & New World Spirit, Time Was, Time Is, 2005
 Joe Chambers, The Outlaw, 2006
 Chris Washburne & The SYOTOS Band, The Land of Nod, 2006
 Charles McPherson, Manhattan Nocturne, 2006
 Roswell Rudd & Yomo Toro featuring Bobby Sanabria & Ascensión, El Espíritu Jíbaro, 2007
 Cándido, Hands of Fire, 2007
 John Fedchock New York Big Band, Up And Running, 2007
 Arturo O'Farrill & Friends Play The Music of Eugene Marlow, A Wonderful Discovery, 2007
 Inza Bama, House Of Bamba, 2008
 Sooz, I Wanna Iguana, 2010
 Gabriele Tranchina, A Song of Love's Color, 2010
 Eugene Marlow, Celebrations: The Heritage Ensemble Interprets Festive Melodies from the Hebraic Songbook, 2010
 Eugene Marlow, A Fresh Take, 2011
 Eugene Marlow, Hitz & Pizz: A Rhythm Extravaganza, 2011
 Susan Goodman Jackson, Live Out Loud,  2012 
 Chris Washburne & The SYOTOS Band, Land of Nod, 2013
 Ben Lapidus, Ochosi Blues, 2014
 Eugene Marlow, Mosaica, 2014 
 Art Lillard's Heavenly Big Band, Certain Relationships, 2015
 Eugene Marlow, Changes, 2015
 Max Pollack, Rumba Tap, 2015
 John Fedchock New York Big Band, Like It Is, 2015
 Eli Fountain, Percussion Discussion, Masterpiece, 2015
 Pucci Amanda Jhones, Love Jones, 2015
 In Their Own Voice, Vol. V: Eugene Marlow & The Heritage Ensemble feat. Jennifer Jade Ledesna, Amelie Cherubin, Shira Shira Lissek
 Eugene Marlow, A Night So Silent Night, 2016
 Eugene Marlow, Obrigado Brasil, 2016
 Eugene Marlow, Blue In Green, Original Compositions by Eugene Marlow inspired by The Jazz Poems of Grace Schulman, 2019
 The Afro-Caribbean Artistry of Bobby Sanabria & Matthew Gonzalez, 2019
 David Child's, Child's Play, 2020
 Rie Akagi, La Flauta Magica, 2020
 Gabriela Anders, Los Dukes, A Latina Tribute To Duke Ellington, 2021
 Mary LaRose, Out There, 2021
 Eugenie Jones, Players, 2022
 The Manhattan Transfer, 50'', 2022

Films
 The Palladium Where Mambo Was King - associate producer, on screen personality (Kaufman Films, BRAVO 2002)
 From Mambo To Hip Hop - A South Bronx Tale - associate producer, on screen personality, composer of soundtrack (Citylore, PBS 2006)
 Latin Music U.S.A. - assistant producer, on screen personality (PBS 2009)
 We Like It That - The Story of Latin Boogaloo - on screen personality (Citylore, 2015)
 Let's Get The Rhythm - on screen personality (Citylore, 2016)
 Some Girls - composer of soundtrack (Cepeda Films, 2017)
 La Madrina - The Savage Life of Lorine Padilla - composer of soundtrack (Cepeda Films, 2020)

Endorsements
TAMA Drums,
Sabian Cymbals,
Latin Percussion Inc.,
Remo Drumheads,
Vic Firth Sticks

References

External links
Bobby Sanabria official site
Bobby Sanabria interview on AllAboutJazz
Bobby Sanabria interview on Latin Jazz Club
 Cue the Finger Snapping – Bobby Sanabria Pours Love Into “West Side Story Reimagined” - debbieburkeauthor.com

1957 births
Latin jazz drummers
People from the Bronx
Musicians from New York City
Berklee College of Music alumni
Zoho Music artists
Living people